The Jimmy V Classic is an annual basketball game organized by ESPN Events to raise money and awareness for cancer research. It is named after Jim Valvano and features clips from his speech at the 1993 ESPY Awards.

History
Beginning in 1995 the Jimmy V Men's classic features four teams in a double header. 

The Jimmy V Women's Classic began in 2002 featuring four teams in a double header. In 2005, the Women's classic reduced to two teams a year in a single game.

Men's yearly results

* denotes overtime period
Source:

Men's wins by team

Women's yearly results

Source:

Women's wins by team

References

External Links
Jimmy V. Classic

Recurring sporting events established in 1995
1995 establishments in New Jersey
College basketball competitions
College men's basketball competitions in the United States
College women's basketball competitions in the United States
Annual sporting events in the United States